Pamuk is a village in Somogy county, Hungary.

Etymology 

Pamuk is a Turkish word meaning cotton.

External links 
 Street map

References 

Populated places in Somogy County